Mirinaba curytibana is a species of air-breathing land snail, a terrestrial pulmonate gastropod mollusk in the family Strophocheilidae. This species is endemic to Brazil.

References

Strophocheilidae
Endemic fauna of Brazil
Molluscs of Brazil
Gastropods described in 1952
Taxonomy articles created by Polbot
Taxobox binomials not recognized by IUCN